Chandler River may refer to:

 Chandler River (New South Wales), Australia
 Chandler River (Maine), U.S.
 Chandler River (Alaska), U.S.

See also 
 Chandlers Creek, New South Wales, Australia